Belokomiti is a mountain village and community in the municipal unit of Nevropoli Agrafon, Karditsa regional unit, Greece. In 2011 Belokomiti had a population of 146 for the village and 178 for the community, which includes the village Kedros. Belokomiti is situated in the Agrafa mountains, west of the artificial Lake Plastiras. It is located 9 km southeast of Kryoneri and 21 km southwest of Karditsa. The village is a tourist destination during the summer months. Among its attractions are the Gaki cave (σπηλιά του Γάκη) and its forests.

Population

External links
 Belokomiti on GTP Travel Pages

See also

List of settlements in the Karditsa regional unit

References

Populated places in Karditsa (regional unit)